Daniel da Silva Carvalho (born 1 March 1983), more commonly known as Daniel Carvalho, is a Brazilian former football attacking midfielder.

Career

Club
 Carvalho started his career in his native state of Rio Grande do Sul at Sport Club Internacional before transferring to CSKA Moscow. In 2005, he became the first foreign player to be named Russian Footballer of the Year by Futbol and Sport-Express. Carvalho's brilliant play during the 2005 UEFA Cup was the key to success of his team, who won the competition, defeating Sporting Lisbon in the Final. This made CSKA the first Russian club to ever win a UEFA competition. He was Man of the Match in the final as he was involved in all three of CSKA's goals. He scored in the 3–1 UEFA Super Cup lost to then European Champions Liverpool, but despite this defeat, Carvalho had shown he could cope on the European stage. In November 2007, Carvalho signed a new contract with CSKA until summer 2010, according to CSKA president Yevgeni Giner (or until December 2009, according to CSKA Press Office), with the option of further prolongation and the minimum fee release clause. However, he went on a six-month loan back to SC Internacional in July 2008. Since then he has returned to CSKA and hopes to recapture the form which propelled the Muscovite club to UEFA Cup honours in 2005. On 4 January 2010, Qatari club Al-Arabi Sports Club have signed the Brazilian attacking midfielder from PFC CSKA Moscow.

In May 2010, he was signed by Atlético Mineiro, and once again returned to Brazil.

In March 2013, Carvalho signed for Criciúma. Carvalho's Criciúma contract was cancelled in October 2013.

Carvalho went on to retire from professional football, and join Brazilian futsal side DC Futsal.

On 22 April 2015, Carvalho signed for Brazilian side Botafogo.

International career
Carvalho was called up for a friendly between Brazil and Norway on 16 August 2006 for the first time. He started the match and scored on his debut, and took part in the following 3–0 defeat of Argentina on 3 September. He also scored in the 4–0 win in an unofficial friendly match against Kuwaiti club Al Kuwait on 7 October 2006.

Career statistics

Club

International career
As of 1 April 2009

Honours

Club
Internacional
 Campeonato Gaúcho: 2002, 2003
 Copa Sudamericana: 2008

CSKA Moscow
 Russian Premier League: 2005, 2006
 Russian Cup: 2004–05, 2005–06, 2008–09
 Russian Super Cup: 2004, 2006, 2007, 2009
 UEFA Cup: 2004–05

Palmeiras
Copa do Brasil: 2012

Botafogo
Campeonato Brasileiro Série B: 2015

Goiás
 Campeonato Goiano: 2016

International
Brazil U-20
FIFA U-20 World Cup: 2003

Individual
 Footballer of the Year in Russia (Sport-Express): 2005
 Footballer of the Year in Russia (Futbol): 2005
 In the list of 33 best football players of the championship of Russia: 2005, 2006
 2005 UEFA Cup Final: Man of the match

References

External links
 Profile at Galo Digital 

Daniel Carvalho at ZeroZero

1983 births
Living people
Sportspeople from Rio Grande do Sul
Brazilian footballers
Brazilian expatriate footballers
PFC CSKA Moscow players
UEFA Cup winning players
Sport Club Internacional players
Brazil under-20 international footballers
Brazil international footballers
Expatriate footballers in Russia
Campeonato Brasileiro Série A players
Russian Premier League players
Al-Arabi SC (Qatar) players
Clube Atlético Mineiro players
Sociedade Esportiva Palmeiras players
Criciúma Esporte Clube players
Botafogo de Futebol e Regatas players
Qatar Stars League players
Goiás Esporte Clube players
Association football midfielders